Clement Pălimaru (born 4 February 1986) is a Romanian retired professional footballer who played as a forward.

Club career

Politehnica Iași
Pălimaru started playing football in his hometown, at the LPS Botoșani youth club. During the 2004–05 season, he and teammate Paul Tincu were picked up by Politehnica Iaşi, as they were the most promising players from the centre at that time.

In order to get more playing time, he was loaned to Cetatea Suceava. After 13 matches and five goals scored in the second league (and also two goals against Rapid București in the Romanian Cup; Cetatea lost the match 3–2), he was called back to Politehnica, at that time in shortage of forwards.

Although Pălimaru did get a lot of play time, during the 2006–07 season he began to grow in form and was the team's top scorer in the training games during the winter break. He shortly broke the ice in Liga I, contributing with a goal in the 4–0 victory over Jiul Petroşani.

International career
Pălimaru appeared five times for the Romania under-21 football team. In the 2009 European Under-21 Championship qualifiers he scored the only goal of the game against Malta, in the last minute, after coming on as a substitute.

References

External links
 
 
 

1986 births
Living people
Association football forwards
Sportspeople from Botoșani
Romanian footballers
FC Politehnica Iași (1945) players
FC Botoșani players
AFC Dacia Unirea Brăila players
FC Politehnica Iași (2010) players
FC Gloria Buzău players
Liga I players
Liga II players